The Premier Plate is a Group 3 Thoroughbred handicap horse race in Hong Kong, run at Sha Tin over 1800 metres in June. 

Horses rated 90 and above are qualified to enter the race.

Records

Leading jockey (3 wins):
 Brett Prebble – Beethoven (2006), Bullish Cash (2008), Thumbs Up (2012)

Leading trainer (3 wins):
Caspar Fownes – Thumbs Up (2012), Rise High (2019), Dances With Dragon (2020)
 John Moore – Military Attack (2013), Harbour Master (2015), Helene Paragon (2016)

Winners

See also
 List of Hong Kong horse races

References 
Racing Post:

 Racing Information of Premier Plate (2011/12)
 The Hong Kong Jockey Club 

Horse races in Hong Kong